Khlyst is an American drone doom band, formed in 2006.

In Russian, the word means "switch", "whip", or "scourge".

Biography
Khlyst is a drone doom project that features guitarist James Plotkin (Khanate, Phantomsmasher, OLD), vocalist Runhild Gammelsæter (Thorr's Hammer), and drummer Tim Wyskida (Khanate, Blind Idiot God).

Line-up
Runhild Gammelsæter - vocals, text
James Plotkin - Electric guitar, laptop
Tim Wyskida - drums, gong

Discography
Chaos Is My Name (CD, Hydra Head Records, 2006)
Chaos Live (DVD, Hydra Head Records, 2008) Limited to 500 copies, worldwide. Recorded November 2, 2006 in New York City.

External links
Official site
Khlyst on Encyclopedia Metallum

American doom metal musical groups
American avant-garde metal musical groups
Musical groups established in 2006
American musical trios
Drone metal musical groups